Privacy Act may refer to:

Privacy Act of 1974, United States
Privacy Act (Canada)
Privacy Act 1988, Australia
Privacy Act 2020, New Zealand